Mysterious Island is a USSR film adaptation of the 1874 novel The Mysterious Island by Jules Verne.

Plot summary
During the siege of Richmond, Virginia, in the American Civil War, five northern prisoners of war decide to escape in a rather unusual way – by hijacking a balloon.

The group eventually crash-lands on a cliff-bound, volcanic, unknown (and fictitious) island, located in the South Pacific. They name it "Lincoln Island" in honour of American President Abraham Lincoln.  With the knowledge of the brilliant engineer, the five are able to sustain themselves on the island, producing fire, pottery, bricks, nitroglycerine, iron, a simple electric telegraph, and even a seaworthy ship. They also manage to find their geographical location.

The mystery of the island seems to come from periodic and inexplicable deus ex machinas: the unexplainable survival of Smith from his fall from the balloon, a box full of equipment (guns and ammunition, tools, etc.), and so on.

A crew of pirates arrives at the Lincoln Island to use it as their hideout. After some fighting with the heroes, the pirate ship is mysteriously destroyed by an explosion, and the pirates themselves are found dead, apparently in combat, but with no visible wounds.

The secret of the island is revealed when it turns out to be Captain Nemo's hideout, and home harbour of the Nautilus. Captain Nemo had been the savior of the heroes, sending a message about a fellow castaway, torpedoing the pirate ship.

Cast
 Andrey Andriyenko-Zemskov as Pencroft
 Yuri Grammatikati as Herbert
 Pavel Kiyansky as Gideon Spillett
 Nikolai Komissarov as Captain Nemo
 Igor Kozlov as Tom Ayrton
 Alexei Krasnopolsky as Capt. Cyrus Harding (Smith)
 Robert Ross as Neb
 Andrei Sova as Jupe

References

External links
 

1941 films
Films based on The Mysterious Island
Soviet black-and-white films
Soviet science fiction films
Odesa Film Studio films
1940s science fiction films
American Civil War films
Films set in the Pacific Ocean
Pirate films
Films set in Richmond, Virginia
Films about prison escapes
1940s American films